The Hazar bleak (Alburnus heckeli) is a species of ray-finned fish in the family Cyprinidae. It is endemic to Lake Hazar in Turkey.

References

heckeli
Endemic fauna of Turkey
Fish described in 1943
Taxonomy articles created by Polbot